Top Drawer is a 1983 album by Mel Tormé, accompanied by George Shearing.

At the 26th Grammy Awards, Tormé's performance on this album won him the Grammy Award for Best Jazz Vocal Performance, Male.

Track listing
 "A Shine on Your Shoes" (Howard Dietz, Arthur Schwartz) – 3:06
 "How Do You Say Auf Wiedersehen?" (Johnny Mercer, Tony Scibetta) – 5:45
 "Oleo" (Sonny Rollins) – 4:15
 "Stardust" (Hoagy Carmichael, Mitchell Parish) – 5:45
 "Hi Fly" (Randy Weston) – 3:24
 "Smoke Gets in Your Eyes" (Otto Harbach, Jerome Kern) 6:02
 "What's This?" (Dave Lambert) – 3:13
 "Away in a Manger" (Traditional) – 3:51
 "Here's to My Lady" (Rube Bloom, Mercer) – 3:20

Personnel 
 Mel Tormé - vocals
 George Shearing - piano
 Don Thompson - double bass

References

1982 albums
Concord Records albums
Mel Tormé albums
George Shearing albums
Albums produced by Carl Jefferson
Grammy Award for Best Jazz Vocal Performance, Male